Qarah Khan (also Romanized as Qarah Khān and Qareh Khān) is a village in Mokriyan-e Gharbi Rural District, in the Central District of Mahabad County, West Azerbaijan Province, Iran. At the 2006 census, its population was 637, in 102 families.

References 

Populated places in Mahabad County